Endri Fuga (born in Tirana on 11 November 1981) is the Prime Minister of Albania's Edi Rama Director of Communications and runs the current government's media and public affairs strategy. Fuga's long-term cooperation with the Prime Minister datesback to the time when Rama was mayor of Tirana. Fuga became known as the modernizer of the Socialist Party communications systems, as well as the architect of the 2013 left wing coalition campaign, which was characterized by the massive use of digital communication and social media. Prior to joining Rama at the Municipality of Tirana, Fuga was a civic society advocate, working closely with his friend, current Mayor of Tirana Erion Veliaj. Fuga has also been contracted as a consultant for different international organizations, like USAID, IRI, the Open Society Foundation in different parts of the world, including Europe, Africa, Asia and South America.

Education
Fuga started his university studies at Sapienza University of Rome. He then transferred his undergraduate studies to the Vienna campus of Webster University after his father, Perparim Fuga was employed as a nuclear expert at the International Atomic Energy Agency in Vienna. In this task, Perparim Fuga was part of a team led by Mohamed ElBaradei, who won the Nobel Prize in 2005 for limiting the use of nuclear energy for military purposes.

Fuga completed his bachelor studies for media communications in 2007 in Vienna. He was granted his postgraduate degree in International Relations in 2017 by Tufts University, Fletcher School of Law and Diplomacy in Boston, USA. Fuga also received a leadership executive course diploma by Harvard's Kennedy School of Government in 2011.

Career

In December 2002, during the winter holidays in Tirana, Fuga, together with high school friends, Erion Veliaj, Arbi Mazniku and Marinela Lika co-conceived the grass root campaignMJAFT! (Enough!).

This campaign was based on a series of youth protests and awareness rasing events aimed at forming a civil resistance to phenomena such as bad governance, corruption, social marginalization, vengeance, etc. The initial success of the campaign convinced Fuga to prolong his stay in Albania, co-founding the "MJAFT!" movement.

With the transformation of the idea of "MJAFT!" into a genuine civil society organization, Fuga assumed the position of its director of communications and was determinant in the media strategies that the organization pursued until his departure in 2007. The innovative concepts and new ways of civil resistance that “MJAFT!” used for the first time in Albania,were recognized locally and internationally, and in 2004 it was awardedthe United Nations civic society award.

In 2007, Fuga chose to actively engage in the political scene, accepting the invitation of the Mayor of Tirana at the time, Edi Rama to become his communications adviser. His formal role as adviser of Rama consisted in overseeing public relations as well as maintaining connections with international organizations and partners on behalf of the Municipality of Tirana.

During that time, Fuga became the link between Rama and the local and foreign media, playing a key role in transforming Rama's image, from a charismatic personto to a charismatic leader.

During 2011–2013, Fuga served as director of communications in the Socialist Party and assumed the position of strategist of the opposition coalition campaign during the 2013 parliamentary elections. During the 2013 campaign, Fuga was the "brain" behind the usage of a broad range of communication instruments, which had not been tried before in Albania. The widespread use of social media, direct marketing, and concentrationon focus groups and surveys to build a message were just some of the innovative elements used during this campaign.

During the 2013 campaign, Fuga worked alongside Alastair Campbell, UK Prime Minister's Advisor,  Tony Blair and Arthur J. Finkelstein, advisorsenior consultant of the Republican Party in the US.

He was also one of the co-authors of the "Reneissance (Rilindja)" program, the “manifesto” used by the Socialist Party during the elections.

In 2013, the Socialist Party won by a landslide the general elections. After the victory, the newly elected Prime Minister Edi Rama illustrated the influence of Fuga in the campaign by posting a picture saying: "EndriFuga - The Man who puts Rama in line" 

With the Socialist Party as the ruling government, Fuga is a personal advisor to the Prime Minister and takes care of the communications and image of the Albanian government. One of his main achievements in government was to coordinate and unify the public image and strategic messages of all ministries and departments serving the government. Under his request, a Special Advisor for Communications was appointed in every Ministry, who had to report both to the Minister as well as Fuga.

Fuga has also served as the political editor of Jugendstil, an english-based weekly newspaper in Vienna, Austria. He has also been contracted by several international organizations for consultancy work in Africa, Europe, Asia and South America.

Fuga has been a guest lecturer at many public and private Universities in Albania and Kosovo.

Controversies
The opposition has repeatedly attacked Fuga on a number of occasions, casting suspicion that he stands behind the departure of a number of old Socialist Party members. According to critics, Fuga has used his personal influence to the Prime Minister to promote new figures and friends from Mjaft.

Due to the low public profile that he has held (only two public communications over many years), Fuga has been repeatedly seen by opponents as the "gray eminence” of the Albanian Government. As a result, his figure has been the inspiration for many conspiracy articles, where he appears to be one of the most important persons in every day's decision-making process.

In 2015, the newspaper "Dita" stated that it was put under pressure by Fuga to erase critical news about the government. In a reaction on Twitter, Fuga replied: "They publish false news for pilots and helicopters and when you oppose them with facts they say: We can’t erase cause that news has already 5,000 clicks!"

Personal life
Fuga is married to Mrs. Besa Pellumbi, with whom he has a daughter.

References 

Living people
1981 births